Joël Marc Abati (born 25 April 1970) is a French handball player who has played ten years for SC Magdeburg in Germany until 2007. After returning to France and playing two years for Montpellier HB he ended his professional career in 2009, having won numerous prizes for his clubs and his country. In November 2019 he signed as trainer for the Belgian club Sporting Pelt.

With France national team he is Olympic champion in 2008, World champion in 2001 and 2009 and European champion in 2006.

Club history
 Espoir de Floreal (France)
 1990-91   : Saint Michel sur Orges (France)
 1991-92   : Levallois (France)
 1992-95   : USM Gagny (France)
 1995-97   : US Créteil (France)
 1997-2007 : SC Magdeburg (Germany)
 2007-2009 : Montpellier HB (France)

Honors 
with France national team
Olympic games
 Gold in 2008
 5th in 2004
World Men's Handball Championship
 Gold in 2001, 2009
 Bronze in 2003 2005
European Men's Handball Championship
 Gold in 2006
 Bronze in 2008

with clubs
 EHF Champions League: 2002
 EHF Cup: 1999, 2001, 2007
 German Championship: 2001
 French Championship: 2008, 2009
 French Cup: 1997, 2008, 2009
 French League Cup: 2008

References

External links

 

1970 births
Living people
Sportspeople from Fort-de-France
French male handball players
Olympic handball players of France
Handball players at the 2004 Summer Olympics
Handball players at the 2008 Summer Olympics
Olympic gold medalists for France
Martiniquais handball players
French people of Martiniquais descent
Montpellier Handball players
Olympic medalists in handball
Medalists at the 2008 Summer Olympics
French expatriate sportspeople in Germany